M. Hamsa was a member of 13th Kerala Legislative Assembly. He belongs to Communist Party of India (Marxist) and represents Ottappalam constituency.

Positions held
 Recipient of K.P.S. Menon Award for the best student of N.S.S.K.P.T.H.S. for the year 1979
 President, S.F.I. Palakkad District Committee and D.Y.F.I. Block Committee, Ottappalam
 Member, State Committee, S.F.I., Ottappalam Grama Panchayath and Municipality Advisory Committee
 Branch Secretary, Local Secretary and Area Committee Secretary (16 years), C.P.I.(M) 
 Director, Ottappalam S.C.B.
 Chairman, Ottappalam Urban Co-operative Bank for 11 years
State President of Asianet Satellite Communication Employees Union (C.I.T.U.) (present)
District Joint Secretary, C.I.T.U (present)
Vice-President, State Committee, Government Press Workers Union (C.I.T.U.) (present)

Personal life
He was born on 27 June 1961 at Thozhuppadam, Chelakkara. He is the son of M. Usman and C. Fathima. He is married to P.B Shamlabi and has two children. He lives in Ottappalam, Palakkad.

References

Kerala MLAs 2011–2016
Communist Party of India (Marxist) politicians from Kerala
1961 births
Living people